Adhemar Serpa (7 October 1898 – 4 November 1978) was a Brazilian water polo player. He competed in the men's tournament at the 1932 Summer Olympics.

References

1898 births
1978 deaths
Brazilian male water polo players
Olympic water polo players of Brazil
Water polo players at the 1932 Summer Olympics
Water polo players from Rio de Janeiro (city)